The 24th Infantry Division (24-ya Pekhotnaya Diviziya) was an infantry formation of the Russian Imperial Army. It was part of the 1st Army Corps.

Organization
1st Brigade
93rd "Irkutski" Infantry Regiment
94th "Eniceiski" Infantry Regiment
2nd Brigade
95th "Krasnoyarski" Infantry Regiment
96th "Omski" Infantry Regiment
24th Artillery Brigade

Commanders
1868–1876: Alexander Petrovich Barklai de-Tolli-Veimarn
1897-1902: Leonid Matveyevich Dembowsky
1902-1904: Anton Yegorovich von Saltza

References

Infantry divisions of the Russian Empire
Military units and formations disestablished in 1918